Bagombo Snuff Box is a collection of 23 short stories written by Kurt Vonnegut. The stories were originally published in US periodicals between 1950 and 1963, and consisted of virtually all of Vonnegut's previously published short fiction of the 1950s and 60s that had not been collected in 1968's Welcome to the Monkey House. This collection was published in 1999 by G. P. Putnam's Sons.

Vonnegut revised three stories for publication in this collection: "The Powder-Blue Dragon" (1954), "The Boy Who Hated Girls" (1956), and "Hal Irwin's Magic Lamp" (1957). The unrevised version of "Hal Irwin's Magic Lamp" was anthologized in Canary in a Cat House (1961). The final work in the collection, "Coda to My Career as a Writer for Periodicals", is an essay in which Vonnegut reflects on the writing of the stories in this collection, and the person he was at the time.

The title story, "Bagombo Snuff Box", was adapted into a short film by Igor Stanojević. The film, called Čovek iz Bagomba or The Man from Bagombo, stars Dragan Jovanović and Gala Videnović; it premiered in 2010.

Stories

Notes

References
 

1999 short story collections
G. P. Putnam's Sons books
Short story collections by Kurt Vonnegut